Kunwar Rewati Raman Singh (born 5 October 1943) is an Indian politician from the Allahabad Lok Sabha Constituency in Uttar Pradesh. He played a major role in the establishment of the Samajwadi Party with SP supremo Mulayam Singh Yadav, Beni Prasad Verma and Azam Khan. 

He is the national secretary of Samajwadi Party. He has served Karachana, the Vidhan Sabha constituency of Allahabad more than 7 times as a Member of the Legislative Assembly (MLA). He was also elected as a Member of Parliament (Lok Sabha) from Allahabad twice after defeating the popular BJP politician, Murali Manohar Joshi in 2004 general elections. He has now been elected as an MP (Rajya Sabha) from Uttar Pradesh. He was made irrigation minister and environment minister.

Early life

Rewati Raman Singh was born in a Bhumihar family. He actively took part in the JP Movement against emergency imposed by Indira Gandhi. He had also worked with Minister of External Affairs Sushma Swaraj and many other leaders to clean the holy Ganges river. He had worked with many popular leaders like former prime minister V. P. Singh, Chandra Shekhar, and Raj Narain.

Positions held
Member, Public Accounts Committee
Leader of opposition, Uttar Pradesh Legislative Assembly (from 6th December 1991 to 6th December 1992)
Member of Parliament from Allahabad (Lok Sabha constituency) two terms (2004 and 2009)
Member of Parliament Rajya Sabha from Uttar Pradesh from 2016 to 2022

References

1943 births
Living people
Politicians from Varanasi
India MPs 2004–2009
Samajwadi Party politicians
Janata Dal politicians
Lok Sabha members from Uttar Pradesh
India MPs 2009–2014
Leaders of the Opposition in the Uttar Pradesh Legislative Assembly
Rajya Sabha members from Uttar Pradesh
Politicians from Allahabad